St. Andrew's Church is a Grade II listed Gothic Victorian church in Richmond Hill, Bournemouth, Dorset, England. A United Reformed church, it is noted for being the largest church in the town.

The church stands behind the Norfolk Royale Hotel, next to Bournemouth Town Hall and opposite the Bournemouth War Memorial.

History 
The original church was built in 1856, but the current building was built in 1891 and has since been the largest church in Bournemouth.

Gallery

See also 

 List of churches in Bournemouth

References 

1891 establishments in England
Churches completed in 1891
Churches in Bournemouth
Grade II listed churches in Dorset
United Reformed churches in England
Gothic Revival architecture in Dorset
Gothic Revival church buildings in England